The 2018–19 Championnat National 3 is the second season of the fifth tier in the French football league system in its current format. The competition is due to be contested by 168 clubs split geographically across 12 groups of 14 teams. The teams include amateur clubs (although a few are semi-professional) and the reserve teams of professional clubs.

Teams
On 13 July, the French Football Federation ratified the constitution of the competition, and published the groups as follows: 

 123 teams that were not relegated or promoted from the 2017–18 Championnat National 3 groups.
 9 teams relegated from 2017–18 Championnat National 2 after any reprieves and additional administrative relegations to the Regional Leagues (Raon-l'Étape, Fontenay, Rennes (res), Tarbes, Montceau, St-Louis Neuweg, Limoges, Beauvais and AC Amiens)
 36 teams promoted from Regional Division d'Honneur (as shown in the table below).

Promotion and relegation
If eligible, the top team in each group will be promoted to Championnat National 2. If a team finishing top of the group is ineligible, or declines promotion, the next eligible team in that group will be promoted.

Generally, three teams will be relegated from each group to their respective top regional league, subject to reprieves. Extra teams will be relegated from a group if more than one team is relegated to that group from Championnat National 2. In the case that no teams are relegated to a group from Championnat National 2, one less team will be relegated from that group to the regional league.

Reserve teams whose training centre is categorised as category 2B or lower cannot be promoted to Championnat National 2 by the rules of the competition. It was announced in September 2018 that the following reserve teams would be ineligible for promotion following the categorisation of their training centres:
AC Ajaccio, Amiens SC, Brest, Clermont, Dijon and Paris FC.

League tables

Group A: Nouvelle-Aquitaine

Group B: Pays de la Loire

Group C:  Centre-Val de Loire

Group D: Provence-Alpes-Côte d'Azur-Corsica

Group E: Bourgogne-Franche-Comté

Group F: Grand Est

Group H: Occitanie

Group I: Hauts-de-France

Group J: Normandy

Group K: Brittany

Group L: Île-de-France

Group M: Auvergne-Rhône-Alpes

Season outcomes

Promotion
Angoulême, Angers (res), Bourges Foot, SC Bastia, Louhans-Cuiseaux, Mulhouse, Montpellier (res), Saint-Quentin, Rouen, Guingamp (res), Gobelins and Chamalières finished in the promotion places, and were promoted to 2019–20 Championnat National 2, subject to ratification by the FFF.

On 12 June 2019, the financial regulator of the FFF, the DNCG denied Mulhouse promotion, subject to appeal. The decision was successfully appealed, and Mulhouse were promoted.

Champions
The title of Champion of Championnat National 3 is awarded to the team with the best record in games against the teams that finished in 2nd to 6th place in their group, with goal difference to separate ties.

Saint-Quentin are Champions of 2018–19 Championnat National 3.

Relegation
Pau (res), Cestas, Montmorillon, Chauray, Laval (res), La Suze, Amilly, Saint-Jean-le-Blanc, Cannet, Le Pontet, ÉF Bastia, AS Saint-Rémy, La Charité, Avallon, Grandvillars, Sarreguemines, Nancy (res), Épernay, Agde, Lozère, Tarbes, Senlis, Dunkerque (res), Tourcoing, Chantilly, ASPTT Caen, Bayeux, Déville-Maromme, Montagnarde, Atlantique Vilaine, Brétigny, Le Mée, Meaux Academy, Noisy-le-Sec, Moulins and Ytrac finished in the relegation places and were relegated to the top division of their respective regional leagues, subject to any reprieves detailed in the next section.

Reprieves
In Group D, Bastelicaccia were reprieved due to the reprieve of Monaco (res) in 2018–19 Championnat National 2, caused by the decision of Paris Saint-Germain (res) not to participate next season. Subsequently, on 11 July 2019, they were re-relegated as a result of the relegation of Athlético Marseille from 2018–Championnat National 2.

In Group H, Agde were reprieved due to the reprieve of Nîmes (res) in Championnat National 2, caused by the administrative relegation of Tours FC to Championnat National 3 (where they will take the place of their reserve team).

In Group F, Sarreguemines were reprieved due to the reprieve of Haguenau in Championnat National 2, caused by the administrative relegation of Athlético Marseille.

In Group B, Laval (res) were reprieved due to the administrative relegation of Saint-Nazaire.

In Group A, Pau (res) were reprieved due to the administrative relegation of Limoges.

Top scorers

References 

2018
5
Fra